Plaeng Nam is a name of a road that intersects from Charoen Krung to Yaowarat Roads in the area of Bangkok's Chinatown, includes also eponymous four-way intersection where it meets Charoen Krung and Phlapphla Chai roads, which is regarded as the starting point of Phlappha Chai, while the next intersection on Charoen Krung side is Mo Mi. 

Plaeng Nam is about 100 m. (328 ft.) long. In the past, it was a place for garbage dumping of locals because it was close to the wet market. Therefore has a foul and dirty condition even the name was called Trok Pacha Ma Nao (ตรอกป่าช้าหมาเน่า; lit: "lane of rotten dog graveyard"). Until the reign of King Prajadhipok (Rama VII), he improved the conditions of the city, including various utilities. So, he gave the official name Plaeng Nam for auspiciousness, which can be literally translated that "renaming".

Today, in this alley on both sides is a small two-story shophouse, which are eateries such as noodles, pork stomach and duck porridge, 24 hours à la carte, cafés, shark fin soup and bird's nest soup, shumai stall, Chinese pastry, Chinese sausage. And there is Vietnamese temple named "Wat Mongkol Samakhom", including an antique tin kerosene lamp and traditional Chinese musical instrument shops. 

At the entrance of the alley on Charoen Krung side is a Wat Mangkon Station (BL29) located, the extension MRT Blue Line. This station built with Sino-Portuguese in order to harmonize with the surrounding buildings which is a historic area.

References

Streets in Bangkok
Samphanthawong district
Road junctions in Bangkok